Judge Bruce may refer to:

Colin S. Bruce (born 1965), judge of the United States District Court for the Central District of Illinois
J. Gregory Bruce (1897–1985), judge of the United States Tax Court
John Bruce (judge) (1832–1901), judge of the United States District Courts for the Northern, Middle, and Southern Districts of Alabama

See also
James Knight-Bruce (1791–1866), judge of the Court of Appeal in Chancery